Sarneran (also Romanized as Sarnerān; also known as Sorkh-e Kān (Persian: سرخکان)) is a village in Gavkan Rural District, in the Central District of Rigan County, Kerman Province, Iran. At the 2006 census, its population was 146, in 25 families.

References 

Populated places in Rigan County